Sam Loxton was a member of Donald Bradman's famous Australian cricket team, which toured England in 1948. Bradman's men went undefeated in their 34 matches; this unprecedented feat by a Test side touring England earned them the sobriquet The Invincibles.

A batting all rounder, Loxton played as a right-handed middle-order batsman and a right-arm fast medium bowler who reinforced the frontline pace attack of Ray Lindwall, Keith Miller and Bill Johnston. Starting the tour as a fringe player, Loxton was omitted for the pre-Test fixtures against Worcestershire and the Marylebone Cricket Club, where Australia traditionally fielded their full-strength team. He was overlooked for the first two Tests; reserve opening batsman Bill Brown played out of position in the middle-order. However, Brown struggled in the unfamiliar role, and Loxton scored 159 not out against Gloucestershire to oust the former from his position for the Third Test at Old Trafford. Loxton scored 36 to help Australia avoid the follow on and salvage a draw, before making his most notable contribution in the Fourth Test at Headingley. He took 3/55 in the first innings and scored a counter-attacking 93 on the third day to keep Australia in the game; they went on to win after a world record-breaking run-chase on the final day. Loxton also played in the Fifth Test and ended the series with 144 runs at a batting average of 48.00 and three wickets at a bowling average of 49.33.

In the tour matches, Loxton sometimes opened the bowling when Bradman sought to rest Lindwall and Miller to save their energy for the Tests, and he occasionally batted above the middle-order. Loxton was the most economical, but the least incisive of the bowlers, and he never took more than three wickets in an innings. He played 22 first-class matches and scored 973 runs at 57.23 with three centuries, and took 32 wickets at 21.71. He was eighth in the run-scoring aggregates, but was productive when given an opportunity, ranking fifth in the Australian averages. Loxton was the eighth-leading wicket-taker; all seven frontline bowlers ahead of him took at least 50 wickets. Noted for his energetic and combative approach, Loxton was twice forced out of action for his troubles; he pulled a groin while searching for extra pace with the ball early in the tour, and towards the end of the season, he hit a ball into his face and broke his nose.

Background
After serving in World War II, Loxton was demobilised and rose through the cricketing ranks to make his first-class debut in 1946–47. He was an all rounder—a right-handed middle-order batsman and a right-arm fast bowler. During the 1947–48 Australian season, India toured Australia for five Tests, and the home team dominated, taking an unassailable 3–0 series lead after the first four matches. The Australian selectors then decided to use the Fifth Test at the Melbourne Cricket Ground to give opportunities to players on the fringes of the national team to show their capabilities ahead of the 1948 tour of England. Loxton was one of several debutants, and he seized his chance. He scored 80 and took three wickets as an all rounder in the Australian victory, and was rewarded with inclusion in the 17-man touring party.

Early tour
Australia traditionally fielded its first-choice team in the tour opener, which was usually against Worcestershire. Bradman and his co-selectors felt that Loxton was not among the 11 strongest players, so he was not selected against Worcestershire. Loxton's debut had come about because first-choice opener Arthur Morris had been rested from the Fifth Test so that the selectors could trial potential players for the 1948 tour. Sid Barnes had opened in that match with Bill Brown. Morris and Barnes were Bradman's preferred pair and they opened against Worcestershire, while Brown, who was on his third tour of England, was played out of position in the middle-order, pushing Loxton out of the team. Loxton looked on as Brown made 25 and Australia won by an innings.

In the next match against Leicestershire, Loxton was given his first chance on English soil. Batting at No. 7, he managed only four before being trapped leg before wicket by Australian expatriate left arm orthodox spinner Vic Jackson, as Australia amassed 448. He then opened the bowling and castled home captain Les Berry for one to leave the hosts at 1/1 and take his first wicket on English soil. He also took two catches, both from the bowling of fellow Victorian Doug Ring as the hosts fell for 130. Loxton again opened the bowling in the second innings as Australia enforced the follow on and dismissed the hosts for 147 to seal another innings win. Loxton took 1/11 and 0/12 from six and seven overs respectively.

The Australians then proceeded to play Yorkshire, on a damp pitch that suited slower bowling. Loxton bowled only one over, which was a maiden, before pulling his groin while trying to attain more pace, as the hosts were bowled out for 71. He was unable to bat or bowl again in the game as Australia replied with 101 and then removed the hosts for 89 to leave themselves a target of 60 for victory. Australia came closest to losing for the whole tour. They fell to 6/31, effectively seven down with Loxton unable to bat, before scraping home without further loss, although both batsmen at the crease survived chances. Due to his injury, Loxton was rested for the next two matches against Surrey at The Oval in London and Cambridge University. Australia won both matches by an innings.

In the following match against Essex, Loxton returned as Australia won the toss, batted first and went on to score a world record of 721 first-class runs in one day's play. Loxton came in at 4/452 and put on 56 with Ron Hamence and 166 with Ron Saggers in 65 minutes before falling at 6/664 for 120. Loxton's innings was noted for its hooking and driving and took around 80 minutes. During the innings, Loxton also passed 1,000 first-class career runs. Australia collapsed after Loxton's departure, losing their last five wickets for 57 late on the first day.

Australia then proceeded to victory by an innings and 451 runs, their biggest winning margin for the tour. Loxton was not required to bowl in the first innings as the hosts fell for 83 in 36.5 overs. In the second innings, Loxton was given the new ball and bowled 12 overs without success, conceding 28 runs before Essex were all out for 187.

In the next match against Oxford University, Loxton came in at 4/206 and anchored the innings, remaining unbeaten on 79 as Australia were bowled out for 431. He featured in partnerships with Colin McCool and Doug Ring, who both made fifties. He then took the new ball in both innings, taking 1/14 and 1/16 from five and eight overs respectively in another innings victory. When Oxford batted, Philip Whitcombe struck a delivery from Ernie Toshack to Loxton, and took a few steps out of his crease. Loxton prepared to throw at the Whitcombe's stumps in a run out attempt, but did not release, while Whitcombe stood his ground outside the crease. In those days, the fielding standards were lower, with weaker and less accurate throws and Whitcombe was only a metre or two outside his crease, while Loxton was around thirty away. The next delivery from Toshack was again hit to Loxton, and Whitcombe again wandered outside his crease. This time Loxton threw the ball and hit the stumps directly, running out the batsman, who was unable to comprehend what had happened and shook his head.

The next match was against the Marylebone Cricket Club (MCC) at Lord's. The MCC fielded seven players who would represent England in the Tests, and were basically a full strength Test team, while Australia fielded their first-choice team. It was a chance for all players to gain a psychological advantage over their opponents for the Tests.

Loxton had scored 203 runs in three innings at an average of 101.50, but was not selected, nor was middle-order batsman Harvey, who had scored a century in the previous Test against India. Harvey struggled to adapt to English conditions at the start of his first tour and made only 83 runs at 16.60 in five innings on tour. Brown, who had scored 527 runs at 75.28 for the season so far, including three centuries in his last three innings, was played out of position in the middle-order, even though he had batted as an opener in every tour match other than against Worcestershire. Due to the rotation policy in the tour matches, only two of the three openers Brown, Morris and Barnes played in any one game while the other rested, except when Bradman tried to fit all three in a full-strength team by having Brown in the middle-order. The team was exactly the same as for the opening fixture against Worcestershire.

Barring one change in the bowling department, the same team went on to be selected for the First Test, with the top six batsmen in the same position. Brown made only 26 as Australia amassed 552 and won by an innings.

The MCC match was followed by Australia's first non-victory of the tour, which was against Lancashire. Loxton top-scored with 39 as Australia batted first and were bowled out for 204 after the first day was washed out. He then took 0/18 from eight overs and made 52 in the second innings before being run out while batting with Harvey as the match ended in a draw. In the second innings, Loxton attempted to attack the bowling of Malcolm Hilton—who had troubled Bradman in the first innings—in an attempt to throw him off his game. However, Hilton had the last laugh and removed Bradman for the second time.

In the following match against Nottinghamshire, Loxton took a total of 0/21 from 12 overs and was run out for 16 as Australia played out another draw. In the next fixture against Hampshire, Australia had another scare. On a drying pitch, Loxton took 1/2, ending the resistance of top-scorer John Arnold for 48 as Australia removed the hosts for 195. He then made a duck as Australia suffered a middle-order collapse and were dismissed for 117. It was the first time that Bradman's men had conceded a first innings lead during the campaign. Loxton then took 0/6 from five overs as Hampshire were bowled out for 103 to leave Australia a victory target of 182 in 175 minutes. He was not required as Australia's top-order batted steadily to take an eight-wicket win. The final match before the First Test was against Sussex. Loxton opened the bowling and took 3/13 from 10 overs as the hosts fell for 86 in 46.4 overs. Australia then declared at 5/549 before he could bat. Loxton was not asked to bowl as Sussex were out for 138 to seal another innings victory. Former Australian Test batsman Jack Fingleton said that Sussex's display was "as depressing a batting performance as the tour knew".

First Test

Up to this point, Brown had scored 800 runs on tour at an average of 72.72, while Loxton had made 310 runs at 51.66. Harvey had scored only 296 runs at 42.29. The other five places in the top six were firmly entrenched in the hands of Barnes, Morris, Bradman, Hassett and Miller, who had all played in those positions regularly since the end of World War II. Brown gained selection out of position in the middle order in the First Test at Trent Bridge, while Loxton and Harvey watched from the sidelines. There was a chance one of them would receive a last-minute call-up as Barnes was ill with food poisoning in the week leading up to the Test, but the opener recovered. Brown made only 17 as Australia won by eight wickets.

Between Tests, Loxton played in the match against Northamptonshire, which started the day after Trent Bridge. With pace spearhead Ray Lindwall injured and Keith Miller rested following a marathon effort in the opening Test, Loxton opened the bowling and took 2/22 from 15 overs the hosts were dismissed for 119. He made only 17 with the bat and took 0/7, again opening in the second innings as Australia cruised to victory by an innings. Loxton was rested for the second match before the Second Test, against Yorkshire; Brown scored a century in a drawn match.

Second Test

Australia opted to field an unchanged line-up for the Second Test at Lord's. Brown managed only 24 and 32 in the middle order as Australia won by 409 runs. Including the matches against Worcestershire and the MCC, he had totalled 123 runs at 24.60 in his five innings in the middle-order. O'Reilly criticised the selection of Brown, who was noticeably uncomfortable in the unfamiliar role. He said that although Brown had made an unbeaten double century on his previous Test at Lord's in 1938, Loxton and Harvey had better claims to selection.

The next match was against Surrey and started the day after the Test. Bradman wanted to allow his leading players a lighter workload after their effort at Lord's, and Miller had an unauthorised night of partying and did not return to the team hotel until dawn, so Loxton opened the bowling, and he took two quick wickets to leave the hosts at 2/14. Loxton ended with 2/37 from 25 overs, sending down the most deliveries among the Australians, as the hosts were all out for 221. He made eight with the bat and again opened the bowling in the second innings, taking 1/53 from 18 overs. Australia needed 122 in the final innings to win, and Loxton and Harvey were promoted after the latter offered to open. Bradman's men wanted to finish the run-chase quickly so they could watch the Australian John Bromwich play in the Wimbledon final. Harvey and Loxton, who were roommates during the tour, made the runs in only 58 minutes in 20.1 overs, with Loxton unbeaten on 47, to complete a 10-wicket win.

The following match against Gloucestershire at Bristol was the last before the Third Test and Loxton's final chance to push his claims for Test duties. Australia reached 7/774 declared, its highest score of the tour, laying the foundation for a victory by an innings and 363 runs. Loxton came in at 4/466 and put on 63 with Harvey, before his fellow Victorian was out for 95. He then added 104 with Colin McCool and 105 with Ian Johnson. Loxton was on 159 when Johnson lost his wicket, which prompted acting captain Lindsay Hassett to declare the innings closed. Loxton's innings involved a series of powerful strokes that went for six and he was particularly noted for using his feet to charge and attack the off spin of Tom Goddard. The Gloucestershire bowler had been touted as a possible Test selection, because the other England bowlers had failed to contain Australia's batsman in the first two matches, but his chances of selection were ended with the tourists' assault at Bristol. Immediately after the declaration, Loxton opened the bowling and ended with 1/22 from as Gloucestershire were all out for 269. Hassett enforced the follow on and Loxton again started proceedings with the ball, but only for two overs. The home side were bowled out for 132 to complete another Australian victory.

Third Test

Australia and England reassembled at Old Trafford for the Third Test. Following his unbeaten 159 in the previous match and Brown's struggles when playing in the middle-order, Loxton took Brown's position. Brown had scored 25, 26, 17, 24 and 32 in the middle-order in the matches against Worcestershire, the MCC and the first two Tests. As fast bowling all rounder Keith Miller had been struggling with a back injury that prevented him from bowling from time to time, Loxton was seen as a necessary reinforcement for the frontline bowlers. England captain Norman Yardley won the toss and elected to bat, and Loxton bowled first change, sending down seven overs for the loss of 18 runs. The Australians themselves opened with Ray Lindwall and Bill Johnston taking the new ball, but Bradman had misjudged the breeze and needed to swap his bowlers' ends. For this purpose, Loxton bowled a solitary over, his first in Ashes cricket. He was erratic in his length and bowled three long hops outside leg stump at the debutant George Emmett, who ignored the opportunity to attack and let the balls pass.

On the second morning, English tailender Alec Bedser had reached 37. His partner Denis Compton hit a ball into the covers and Bradman and Loxton collided in an attempt to field the ball and prevent a run. Compton called Bedser through for a run on the misfield, but Loxton recovered and threw the ball to the wicket-keeper's end. Bedser was a long way short of the crease and was run out. The wicket ended an innings of 145 minutes, in which Bedser scored 37 in a 121-run partnership. England then lost their last three wickets for 26 runs to be all out for 363.

On the third day, Loxton and wicket-keeper Don Tallon both came to the crease with Australia in difficulty at 5/139. Tallon and Loxton added a further 43 before the gloveman was caught behind from Bill Edrich. Lindwall came to the crease to join Loxton at 6/172 as Australia faced the prospect of being forced to follow on. The pair added a further 36 before Loxton was bowled by Dick Pollard, leaving Australia 7/208, still five runs behind the follow on mark, which they scraped past to end with 221. Loxton again bowled first change in the second innings, taking 0/29 from eight overs as England reached 3/174 at the end of the third day. Loxton narrowly missed out on a catch when opener Cyril Washbrook had appeared unsettled by some short-pitched bowling from the Australians. A few uncontrolled hook shots flew in the air, and one of these barely evaded Loxton at fine leg. The fourth day was washed out and England declared without further batting after rain delayed the start on the final day. Play began after the tea break, and Australia needed to score 317 in the last session, while England required ten wickets for victory. Loxton did not bat as Australia reached 1/92 from 61 overs when the match was finally ended by a series of periodic rain interruptions.

After the Test, Loxton bowled first change in the first innings against Middlesex. He took 3/33 from 21 overs as the hosts were bowled out for 203. Loxton removed Leslie Compton, his younger brother and England Test batsman Denis, and Jim Sims in the space of five runs to reduce Middlesex from 5/182 to 8/188. He had a heavier workload than normal in the first innings, as leading paceman Lindwall had turned up inebriated on the first morning and therefore lacked energy and penetration. Loxton then joined Morris at the crease, with Australia in difficulty at 3/53. They put on 172 in 115 minutes before Morris was out for 109, and Loxton followed him at 5/271 for the top-score of 123, having punished the bowlers in a hard-hitting display. Australia then collapsed to be all out for 317. Loxton took 1/15 in the second innings to help seal victory by ten wickets in Australia's only county match before the Fourth Test.

Fourth Test

The teams headed to Headingley in Leeds for the Fourth Test. Harvey came in for the injured Barnes, joining Loxton in the middle-order. Brown was not recalled to join Morris at the top of the order; instead, Hassett was promoted as a makeshift opener.

England won the toss and elected to bat on an ideal batting pitch that was expected to be unhelpful for fast bowling. Opener Len Hutton was dropped by Hassett on 25, after flicking the ball behind square leg from Loxton's bowling. This proved to be costly, as Hutton reached 81 before falling at 1/168. England were 2/268 at the end of the first day. Former Australian Test batsman Jack Fingleton said that Australia's day went "progressively downhill" and said that it was the country's worst day of bowling since World War II, citing the proliferation of full tosses.

On the second morning, the nightwatchman Alec Bedser was attacking Australia. He took 14 from one Ernie Toshack over, before taking another 14 from an Ian Johnson over soon after to reach 47. Loxton was brought on and Bedser hit a ball back near his grasp, but it narrowly evaded him. Bedser reached 79 and England 2/423 when he finally fell, triggering a collapse. At 6/486, Loxton bowled Ken Cranston for 10 to take his first Ashes wicket. Cranston opted to not play at a ball that went straight into his leg stump. Loxton then removed Godfrey Evans and Jim Laker in quick succession as England fell to 496/9. Evans fell meekly, prodding a ball straight to Hassett at silly mid-on, prompting O'Reilly to say that Loxton was "lucky to be on deck when the English tail were falling over themselves in their nervous speed to commit hara-kiri". In contrast, Laker edged Loxton down the leg side and it took a diving, low catch from Saggers to complete the dismissal. Umpire Baldwin asked his colleague Chester at square leg to confirm that the ball had carried on the full before sending Laker back to the pavilion. Miller then took the final wicket without further addition to the score. Loxton ended with 3/55 from 26 overs, the second best economy rate among the Australians.

On the third morning, Loxton came to the crease to join Harvey with the score at 4/189. Australia had been in trouble after losing two quick wickets to be 3/68, but Miller and Harvey counterattacked, adding 121 runs in 90 minutes, their batting likened by Wisden to a "hurricane". Fingleton said that he had never "known a more enjoyable hour" of "delectable cricket". Harvey was unperturbed by Miller's departure, hitting 11 from three consecutive balls. Australia went to lunch at 4/204, with Harvey on 70.

After lunch, Australia scored slowly as Loxton struggled to come to grips with the bowling. Yardley took the new ball in an attempt to trouble the batsmen, but instead, Loxton began to settle in as the ball came onto the bat more quickly. He lofted Pollard to the leg side, almost for six, and then hit three boundaries off another over from the same bowler. Harvey accelerated as well, and 80 minutes into the session, reached his century to a loud reception as Australia passed 250. On each occasion, umpire Frank Chester walked to the edge of the playing field and tried to inspect where the ball landed amongst the crowd, trying to see if the point of impact was beyond the original playing arena. They were ruled as sixes in any case and some thought Chester's actions to be more for theatrical than umpiring purposes. Loxton then dominated the scoring with a display of power hitting. He brought up his 50 by hitting Cranston into the pavilion for six, eliciting spontaneous applause from the English players. It also brought up a century stand, which yielded 105 in only 95 minutes. Harvey was out for 112 from 183 balls, but not before the high run rate during the partnership had helped to swing the match back from England's firm control.

Harvey's departure at 5/294 meant that the first of the bowlers, Johnson, entered the ground. This did not deter Loxton, who was particularly severe on Laker, lifting him into the crowd for four more sixes. Loxton hit two over the leg side followed by consecutive off drives into the gallery. Johnson scored 10 before falling with the score at 6/329. Fifteen runs later, Yardley bowled Loxton for 93. Loxton appeared disappointed at playing such a wild cross-batted swing with a maiden Test century beckoning. Lindwall then made 77 to propel Australia to 458 on the fourth day, just 38 runs in arrears.

In the second innings, Loxton took 0/29 from ten overs, and England batted on for five minutes on the final morning, adding three runs in two overs before Yardley declared at 8/365. Batting into the final day allowed Yardley to ask the groundsman to use a heavy roller. This would help to break up the wicket and make the surface more likely to spin, therefore making life more difficult for Australia's batsmen.

Yardley's declaration left Australia to chase 404 runs for victory. At the time, this would have been the highest ever fourth innings score to result in a Test victory for the batting side. Australia had only 345 minutes to reach the target, but they completed their task with 15 minutes to spare and seven wickets in hand to seal the series 3–0, with Loxton not required to bat.

After the Headingley Test, Loxton came in at 5/344 and made an attacking 51 as Australia batted first and made 456 against Derbyshire. He then took 1/27 from 17.4 overs in the first innings. Australia enforced the follow on and Loxton took the first wicket before returning to take two tail-end wickets and end with 3/16 from 13.4 overs as Australia won by an innings. Loxton was the most economical of the Australian wicket-takers. After six consecutive matches, Loxton was rested for the rain-affected draw against Glamorgan, which did not reach the second innings. The hosts were bowled out for 197 and Australia reached 3/215 when inclement weather ended the match.

Loxton returned in the next match and claimed both openers to end with 2/27 from 19 overs as Warwickshire were bowled out for 138 in their first innings. He then made a duck as Australia struggled to 254 in reply. Loxton bowled six overs and took 0/15 in the second innings before Australia won by nine wickets. Australia then faced and drew with Lancashire for the second time on the tour. Loxton did little, scoring two in his only innings and taking a match total of 1/32, his victim being Test batsman Jack Ikin. In the non-first-class game against Durham, a rain-affected draw that did not reach the second innings, Loxton made 15 in Australia's 282 and then took 1/8 from six overs as the hosts reached 5/73 before rain washed out the match after the first day.

Fifth Test

Australia then headed to The Oval for the Fifth Test. Yardley won the toss and elected to bat on a rain-affected pitch. England were dismissed for 52 in 42.1 overs on the first afternoon; Loxton bowled only two overs for one run as the frontline pacemen made light work of the hosts. His other notable action in the field occurred when Len Hutton the first runs of the match, a single in the first over. This had almost turned into a five when Loxton fired in a wide return, but Barnes managed to prevent from going for four overthrows. Loxton came in on the second day with the score at 5/265 and accompanied the centurion Morris for 39 further runs before Edrich had him caught behind for 15. He appeared uncomfortable with the outswingers and leg cutters of Bedser, and was beaten several times, before Edrich dismissed him. Australia ended at 389. Loxton was economical in the second innings, taking 0/16 from 10 overs as Australia dismissed the hosts for 188 to seal the series 4–0 with another innings victory.

Later tour matches
Seven matches remained on Bradman's quest to go through a tour of England without defeat. Loxton made 16 of 361 as Australia batted first against Kent. He came on late in the first innings and took three of the last four wickets as the hosts fell for 51 in just 23 overs. Loxton bowled all his victims as the hosts fell from 5/48 to 51 all out. It was a similar tale in the second innings, as Loxton removed opener Jack Davies for a duck and ended with 1/12 from six overs as the hosts fell for 124 in only 32.5 overs. Australia had won the match by an innings within two days. In the next fixture against the Gentlemen of England, Loxton made only 17 as Australia eventually declared at 5/610 against a team that featured eight Test players. Loxton then took a match total of 0/37 from 21 overs as Australia completed another innings victory. Loxton was rested for the next match against Somerset, which the tourists won by an innings. Loxton then returned against the South of England. He came in at 5/427 and struck an unbeaten 67 in 75 minutes, before Australia declared at 7/522. He took 1/17 from 11 overs, removing Charlie Barnett as the hosts were bowled out for 298 in their first innings when rain ended the match.

Australia's biggest challenge in the post-Test tour matches was against the Leveson-Gower's XI. During the last Australian campaign in 1938, this team was effectively a full-strength England outfit, but this time Bradman insisted that only six current England Test players be allowed to play. Bradman then fielded a full-strength team, with the only difference from the Fifth Test line-up being the inclusion of Johnson at the expense of Doug Ring. The bowlers skittled the hosts for 177, with Loxton taking 0/12. Loxton came in at 2/327 and made 12, before sweeping a ball from Freddie Brown into his own face and breaking his nose. He retired hurt and took no further part in the match. Australia declared at 8/469 and the hosts were 2/75 when the match ended in a draw after multiple rain delays.

The tour ended with two non-first-class matches against Scotland. Following his injury, Loxton played in neither; Australia won both by an innings. While in Scotland, Loxton's nose was operated on in Edinburgh. Following his injury, Loxton eschewed the sweep shot and advised students to do the same, exhorting them to move onto the front foot to drive instead.

Role

A batting all-rounder, Loxton played as a right-handed middle-order batsman and a right-arm fast medium bowler who reinforced the frontline pace attack of Lindwall, Miller and Bill Johnston. When fit, the trio all bowled before Loxton in the Tests. With medium pacer Ernie Toshack and off spinner Ian Johnson also playing in the Third and Fourth Tests, Loxton was the sixth bowler. In the Fifth Test, Johnson was replaced by leg spinner Ring and the injured Toshack was replaced by a batsman, so Loxton became the fifth bowler. Of the seven regular bowlers, Loxton was the only one who was not a frontline bowler, and as such he had the worst average, the second-worst economy rate and the third-worst strike rate. Loxton ended the Test series with 144 runs at 48.00 and three wickets at 49.33, having bowled 63 overs. Loxton batted at No. 6 or No. 7 during the Tests, and was the last batsman in the batting order before the wicket-keeper and the bowlers.

In the tour matches, Loxton sometimes opened the bowling when Bradman sought to rest Lindwall and Miller in order to conserve their energy for the Tests, such as in both innings of the match against Northamptonshire and the second match against Surrey. In his 22 first-class innings, he batted twice at No. 4 and opened in one innings, but he was otherwise invariably in the middle-order between No. 5 and No. 7.N- Loxton was the most economical of those who bowled more than 70 overs, but also the least incisive, taking a wicket every 67.75 balls, and he never took more than three wickets in an innings, which he managed on three occasions. He played 22 first-class matches and scored 973 runs at 57.23 with three centuries and took 32 wickets at 21.71. Loxton was eighth in the run-scoring aggregates, but was given less opportunities than the other frontline batsmen who scored more heavily; whereas he had 22 innings, they all had at least 26 innings and tended to bat higher in the order. However, Loxton was productive when given a chance, ranking fifth in the averages. Loxton was the eighth-leading wicket-taker; all seven ahead of him took at least 50 wickets.

Wisden Cricketers' Almanack summed up his contribution thus:

Notes

Statistical note

n-[1]

This statement can be verified by consulting all the scorecards for the matches, as listed here.

General notes
References using Cricinfo or Wisden may require free registration for access.

References

 

The Invincibles (cricket)